Line F is a planned addition to the Buenos Aires Underground. After some delays, the budget was announced in 2015 for the first phase of construction from Constitución to Córdoba at a total cost of between 700 and 800 million dollars. As of 2015, it was not yet known if construction would be done as a turnkey project or build to order, however construction was due to start in 2016.

Overview

The line is set to be the most modern in the network, using automatic trains, a Communications-based train control system like the one being installed on Line C, and Platform screen doors. The line is also expected to have the highest ridership figures when compared to the existing lines.

Currently, the second phase of the development is still being defined, since a new railway station is being considered to complement the Retiro railway station, and if Line F is to have access to it, it would mean altering the northern part of the route to connect Line F with Line H further north at the proposed station.

Line E ghost stations
In 2006, it was considered whether the two Line E ghost stations (San José vieja and Constitución) could be used as the southern point of Line F, considering they overlapped the line's trajectory. However, it was later decided that Line F would use a completely new tunnel with new stations given the frequency the line is expected to have.

Line plan
 P. Italia - Constitución:
 Plaza Italia  
 Salguero
 Sánchez de Bustamante
 Pueyrredón 
 Santa Fe 
 Córdoba 
 Corrientes 
 Rivadavia 
 México
 San Juan 
 Sáenz Peña
 Constitución

References

External links 
 Subterráneos de Buenos Aires (Official Page) New Lines
 Buenos Aires Ciudad (Official Government Page) Nuevas Líneas: F, G and I  (Spanish)
 System map

Buenos Aires Underground
Proposed railway lines in Argentina